Erythromelana is a genus of flies in the family Tachinidae.

Species
Erythromelana abdominalis (Townsend, 1919)
Erythromelana arciforceps Inclán, 2013
Erythromelana catarina Inclán, 2013
Erythromelana convexiforceps Inclán, 2013
Erythromelana cryptica Inclán, 2013
Erythromelana curvifrons Inclán, 2013
Erythromelana distincta Inclán, 2013
Erythromelana ecuadoriana Inclán, 2013
Erythromelana eois Inclán, 2013
Erythromelana glenriverai Fleming & Wood, 2016
Erythromelana jaena Townsend, 1919
Erythromelana jimmychevezi Fleming & Wood, 2016
Erythromelana leptoforceps Inclán, 2013
Erythromelana napensis Inclán, 2013
Erythromelana nigrithorax (Wulp, 1890)
Erythromelana obscurifrons (Wulp, 1890)
Erythromelana woodi Inclán, 2013

References

Diptera of South America
Exoristinae
Tachinidae genera
Taxa named by Charles Henry Tyler Townsend